The Chronicon complutense sive alcobacense ("Complutensian Chronicle, that is, [from a manuscript] of Alcalá de Henares [ancient Complutum]") is a short medieval Latin history, in the form of annals, of events in Galicia and Portugal up to the death of Ferdinand I "the Great", whom the anonymous chronicler lauds as an "exceedingly strong emperor" (imperator fortissimus), in 1065. It is the earliest "chronicon" dealing with Galaico-Portuguese events. The first edition (editio princeps) was published by Enrique Flórez in 1767. A more recent edition, incorporating the recension known as the Chronicon conimbrigense, was published under the title Annales Portugalenses veteres (APV, "old Portuguese annals") by Pierre David.

Editions
Enrique Flórez, ed. España Sagrada, XXIII, 2nd ed. (Madrid: 1799), 316–18. 
Pierre David, ed. "Annales Portugalenses Veteres", Revista Portuguesa de Historia 3 (1945): 81–128.

References
Porter Conerly (1993). "Cronicones". In Germán Bleiberg. Dictionary of the Literature of the Iberian Peninsula. Greenwood Publishing Group. pp. 469–70.
J. Eduardo López Pereira (1978). "El Elemento godo en los «Annales Portugalenses Veteres»: un problema de crítica textual y de fuentes", Revista Portuguesa de Historia 16: 223–26.

Iberian chronicles
13th-century Latin books